Hastings—Peterborough was a federal electoral district represented in the House of Commons of Canada from 1925 to 1953. It was located in the province of Ontario. This riding was created in 1924 from parts of Hastings East and Peterborough East ridings.

It was initially defined as consisting of the part of the county of Peterborough lying east of and including the townships of Anstruther, Burleigh, Dummer and Asphodel; and the part of the county of Hastings lying north of and including the townships of Rawdon, Huntingdon, Madoc and Elzevir.

In 1933, it was redefined to consist of the part of the county of Peterborough lying east of and including the townships of Anstruther, Burleigh, Dummer and Asphodel; and that part of the county, together with that part of the county of Hastings lying north of a line described as commencing at the southwest corner of the township of Rawdon and following the south boundary of the said township, the south and east boundaries of the township of Huntingdon and the south boundary of the townships of Madoc and Elzevir to the east boundary of the said county.

The electoral district was abolished in 1952 when it was redistributed between Hastings—Frontenac and Peterborough ridings.

Members of Parliament

This riding elected the following members of the House of Commons of Canada:

Election results

|}

|}

|}

|}

|}

|}

|}

See also 

 List of Canadian federal electoral districts
 Past Canadian electoral districts

External links 
Riding history from the Library of Parliament

Former federal electoral districts of Ontario